Terry Irwin is an American designer, academic and Professor and former Head of the School of Design at Carnegie Mellon University. She is a key figure in the development of transition design—an area of design practice, study and research focused on design-led societal transitions towards more sustainable futures.

Career 
Terry Irwin completed an MFA in Design at Switzerland's Schule für Gestaltung Basel. She was a senior designer at Landor Associates until 1989, when she left to establish the San Francisco office of MetaDesign with Erik Spiekermann and Bill Hill. From 1992-2001 she served as creative director at the agency, leading projects for Apple Computer, Nissan Motors, BVG, Audi, Ernst & Young, Sony and Samsung.

In 2003, Irwin moved to Devon to pursue an MSc in Holistic Science at Schumacher College, studying with renowned deep ecologists and physicists including Fritjof Capra. She later joined the faculty at Schumacher to teach ecological design thinking.

In 2009, Irwin returned to the US to take the role of Head of the School of Design at Carnegie Mellon University. She led the redesign of the curriculum, placing sustainability at the heart of all design programs. In 2014, the school introduced transition design as an area of doctoral study and a key thread in both the undergraduate and graduate curricula.

Irwin developed the transition design approach in collaboration with social ecologist Gideon Kossoff and design studies professor Cameron Tonkinwise. Irwin advocates that design should be informed by knowledge outside its traditional disciplinary boundary in order to form a deeper understanding of how to design for change and transition within complex systems.

Irwin has served on the national board of the American Institute of Graphic Arts and organized the 2003 Power of Design Conference in Vancouver. She has held faculty positions at Otis Parsons School of Design, 1986-1989; California College of Arts & Crafts, 1989-2003; and the University of Dundee, 2007-2009. In 2021, Irwin was awarded the AIGA Medal for her design education and philosophy.

References

External links 

 

Living people
Carnegie Mellon University faculty
American designers
Year of birth missing (living people)
American graphic designers
AIGA medalists